Robert Ian "Rob" Templeton MBE (born 15 March 1957) is a former Victorian cricketer. He was born in Hamilton, Victoria, Australia.

He was appointed Member of the Order of the British Empire in the 1989 New Year Honours for services to sport.

In 1999, Templeton was named as the wicket-keeper in Melbourne Cricket Club's "Team of the Century". He played in two first-class matches for Victoria in 1982/83.

See also
 List of Victoria first-class cricketers

References

External links
 
 

Victoria cricketers
Melbourne Cricket Club cricketers
1957 births
Living people
Cricketers from Victoria (Australia)
Australian cricketers
People from Hamilton, Victoria
Australian Members of the Order of the British Empire
Wicket-keepers